Tumpa Autowali is a Bengali daily soap which aired on Colors Bangla from 16 May 2022. It digitally streams on Voot. It produced by Anindya Saha under the banner of Crystal Dreams Production Company and stars Dona Bhowmik and Sayan Bose in leading roles. It is an official remake of Colors Kannada show Mithuna Raashi.

Plot
An independent girl Annapurna Chowdhury "Tumpa Autowali" drives an auto-rickshaw because of family problems, however life takes a turn when she reluctantly married an arrogant businessman named Abir.

Cast
Dona Bhowmik as Annapurna "Tumpa" Chowdhury – An auto driver (2022–)
Sayan Bose as Abir – The owner of a cab company (2022–)
 Sairity Banerjee
 Dolon Roy
 Kaushik Banerjee
 Debika Mitra
 Joyjit Banerjee
 Rii Sen
 Sumit Samaddar
 Chandrayee Bhowmik Pamela
 Paromita Mukherjee
 Anisha Chowdhury

References

Bengali-language television programming in India
2022 Indian television series debuts
Colors Bangla original programming
Television shows set in Kolkata